The 1961–62 season is the 82nd season of competitive football by Rangers.

Overview
Rangers played a total of 58 competitive matches during the 1961–62 season.

Results
All results are written with Rangers' score first.

Scottish First Division

Scottish Cup

League Cup

European Cup

Appearances

See also
 1961–62 in Scottish football
 1961–62 Scottish Cup
 1961–62 Scottish League Cup
 1961–62 European Cup

References 

Rangers F.C. seasons
Rangers